Thomas Leonard Moorwood (21 September 1888 – 1976) was an English professional footballer who played as a goalkeeper.

References

1888 births
1976 deaths
Sportspeople from Wednesbury
English footballers
Association football goalkeepers
West Bromwich Albion F.C. players
Burnley F.C. players
Weymouth F.C. players
Blackpool F.C. players
English Football League players